Girl A may refer to:

Girl A (novel), by Abigail Dean
Sasebo slashing
Sex trafficking in Great Britain